Isaac Moore (8 April 1867 – 10 September 1954) was a Scottish professional footballer who scored 9 goals from 38 appearances in the Football League playing as a left half or forward for Aston Villa, Lincoln City and Burton Wanderers.

Moore was born in Dundee in 1867. He made his debut in the Football League for Aston Villa in the 1889–90 season, scoring three goals from six appearances in all competitions. He spent three seasons with Lincoln City, playing regularly in the Midland League – he was the club's leading scorer in the 1890–91 season, with 16 goals in League and FA Cup – and the Football Alliance before being an ever-present in Lincoln's first season in the newly formed Football League Second Division. He then played in the Football League for Burton Wanderers before joining Southern League club Swindon Town for whom he made eleven league appearances, scoring once.

Moore died in 1954 at the age of 87. His grandson, Thomas Moore, also played with Villa.

Notes
A. : Football League appearances and goals only, not Midland League or Football Alliance.

References

1867 births
1954 deaths
Footballers from Dundee
Scottish footballers
Association football forwards
Lincoln City F.C. players
Aston Villa F.C. players
Burton Wanderers F.C. players
Swindon Town F.C. players
English Football League players
Southern Football League players